Kayu Agung–Palembang–Betung Toll Road or Kapal Betung/Kapalbetung Toll Road is a  tolled expressway, which is part of Trans-Sumatra Toll Road. The toll road is managed by PT Waskita Sriwijaya Tol stretching from the township of Kayu Agung, passing through the major city of Palembang, and terminating at the township of Betung. The toll road connects Lampung–Palembang corridor with the Palembang–Jambi corridor of Trans-Sumatra Toll Road network.

History
The first section of the toll road was inaugurated by President Joko Widodo on 26 January 2021. The President stated that the inauguration of the toll road has cut travel time from Bakauheni to Palembang from 12 hours road trip to only around 3.5 hours of road trip. The second section of the toll road is scheduled to be inaugurated in August 2023.

Sections 
This toll road is divided into three sections:

Section I opened on April 1, 2020, with a temporary exit to Jakabaring.

Exits 
There are 5 planned exits in this toll road:

Currently a temporary exit to Jakabaring is constructed in Section I as other Sections are awaiting completion.

References 

Toll roads in Indonesia
Toll roads in Sumatra